Kari Mette Prestrud (born 28 April 1977) is a Norwegian politician for the Centre Party.

She served as a deputy representative to the Norwegian Parliament from Akershus during the term 2005–2009.

On the local level, she has been a member of Ski municipal council.

References

1977 births
Living people
Deputy members of the Storting
Centre Party (Norway) politicians
Akershus politicians
People from Ski, Norway
21st-century Norwegian women politicians
Place of birth missing (living people)